Ctenolepisma vieirai is a species of silverfish in the family Lepismatidae. It is found in Europe.

References

Further reading

 

Lepismatidae
Articles created by Qbugbot
Insects described in 1981